Thorsten Barg (born 25 August 1986 in Herrenberg) is a German football player, who currently is playing for TSG Wörsdorf as a playing-coach. His brother is Benjamin Barg.

Career
He made his debut on the professional league level in the 2. Bundesliga for SV Wehen Wiesbaden on 8 March 2009, when he started in a game against Rot-Weiss Ahlen.

Statistics

References

External links
 
 Thorsten Barg on Fupa

1986 births
Living people
People from Herrenberg
Sportspeople from Stuttgart (region)
German footballers
VfL Bochum players
VfL Bochum II players
Karlsruher SC II players
SV Wehen Wiesbaden players
2. Bundesliga players
3. Liga players
Association football defenders
Footballers from Baden-Württemberg